Tengana Festival is an annual festival celebrated by the chiefs and people of Tongo Traditional Area. It comprises Balungu, Winkongo and Pwalugu in the Upper East Region of Ghana. It is also a festival of the Talensis. It is celebrated in January.

Celebrations 
During the festival, there is traditional music and dancing whiles there is also general merry-making.

Significance 
This festival is a thanksgiving festival.

References 

Festivals in Ghana
Upper East Region